Zachary Allen Collins (born February 6, 1995) is an American professional baseball catcher in the Cleveland Guardians organization. He has previously played in Major League Baseball (MLB) for the Chicago White Sox, Toronto Blue Jays and Pittsburgh Pirates.

Amateur career
Collins attended American Heritage School in Plantation, Florida along with high school and college teammate Brandon Lopez. He was drafted by the Cincinnati Reds in the 27th round of the 2013 Major League Baseball draft but did not sign; instead, he attended the University of Miami, where he played college baseball for the Miami Hurricanes.

As a freshman at Miami in 2014, Collins played in 61 games and hit .298/.427/.556 with 11 home runs and 54 runs batted in (RBIs). He was named the ACC Freshman of the Year and was Baseball America's Freshman of the Year. As a sophomore in 2015 he played in 66 games, hitting .302/.445/.587 with 15 home runs and 70 RBIs. After the 2015 season, he played collegiate summer baseball with the Cotuit Kettleers of the Cape Cod Baseball League. In his junior year, Collins batted .363 with 16 home runs and 59 RBIs, and his 78 walks were the most in college baseball. He won the Johnny Bench Award.

Professional career

Chicago White Sox
Collins was drafted tenth overall in the 2016 Major League Baseball draft by the Chicago White Sox. After signing, he made his professional debut with the Arizona League White Sox and was promoted to the Winston-Salem Dash after three games. He was named a Carolina League All-Star with the Dash. Collins ended 2016 with a combined .244 batting average with six home runs and 18 RBIs in 39 games between both teams. After the season, the White Sox assigned Collins to the Glendale Desert Dogs of the Arizona Fall League (AFL). He spent 2017 with both Winston-Salem and the Birmingham Barons, posting a combined .224 batting average with 19 home runs and 53 RBIs in 113 games in total between the two clubs.

Collins spent the 2018 season back with Birmingham where he was named to the Southern League All-Star Game, winning the Southern League Home Run Derby. He finished the year batting .234 with 15 home runs and 68 RBIs in 122 games.

He began 2019 with the Charlotte Knights. On June 18, his contract was purchased and he was called up to the major leagues for the first time. Collins debuted as pinch hitter against the Cubs where he drew a walk in his only appearance that game. His first major league hit was a three-run home run versus the Texas Rangers on June 21, 2019. Overall with the 2020 Chicago White Sox, Collins batted .063 with no home runs and 0 RBIs in 9 games.

On April 14, 2021, Collins caught the 20th no-hitter in White Sox history, which Carlos Rodón pitched.

Toronto Blue Jays
On April 3, 2022, Collins was traded to the Toronto Blue Jays in exchange for Reese McGuire. On September 5, 2022, Collins was designated for assignment.

Pittsburgh Pirates
On September 6, 2022, Collins was claimed off waivers by the Pittsburgh Pirates and was optioned to Triple-A Indianapolis. He elected free agency on November 10, 2022.

Cleveland Guardians
On February 9, 2023, Collins signed a minor league contract with the Cleveland Guardians organization.

References

External links

1995 births
Living people
People from Pembroke Pines, Florida
Baseball players from Florida
Major League Baseball catchers
Chicago White Sox players
Toronto Blue Jays players
Pittsburgh Pirates players
Miami Hurricanes baseball players
Cotuit Kettleers players
Arizona League White Sox players
Winston-Salem Dash players
Glendale Desert Dogs players
Birmingham Barons players
Charlotte Knights players
Buffalo Bisons (minor league) players
All-American college baseball players
American Heritage School (Florida) alumni